Spring Hill is a town in Marion County, Indiana, United States.  The population was 98 at the 2010 census. It has existed as an "included town" since 1970, when it was incorporated into Indianapolis as part of Unigov. It is part of Indianapolis, but retains town governmental powers under IC 36-3-1-11.

History
Spring Hill was incorporated as a town in 1927.

Geography
Spring Hill is located at  (39.832911, -86.192631).

Demographics

2010 census
As of the census of 2010, there were 98 people, 55 households, and 31 families living in the town. The racial makeup of the town was 78.6% White, 17.3% African American, 1.0% Native American, and 3.1% from two or more races.

There were 55 households, of which 3.6% had children under the age of 18 living with them, 50.9% were married couples living together, 3.6% had a female householder with no husband present, 1.8% had a male householder with no wife present, and 43.6% were non-families. 34.5% of all households were made up of individuals, and 23.6% had someone living alone who was 65 years of age or older. The average household size was 1.78 and the average family size was 2.19.

The median age in the town was 64.7 years. 4.1% of residents were under the age of 18; 1% were between the ages of 18 and 24; 5% were from 25 to 44; 40.7% were from 45 to 64; and 49% were 65 years of age or older. The gender makeup of the town was 54.1% male and 45.9% female.

2000 census
As of the census of 2000, there were 97 people, 55 households, and 28 families living in the town. The racial makeup of the town was 94.85% White and 5.15% African American.

There were 55 households, out of which 3.6% had children under the age of 18 living with them, 52.7% were married couples living together, and 47.3% were non-families. 36.4% of all households were made up of individuals, and 10.9% had someone living alone who was 65 years of age or older. The average household size was 1.76 and the average family size was 2.21.

In the town, the population was spread out, with 5.2% under the age of 18, 2.1% from 18 to 24, 13.4% from 25 to 44, 47.4% from 45 to 64, and 32.0% who were 65 years of age or older. The median age was 58 years. For every 100 females, there were 94.0 males. For every 100 females age 18 and over, there were 95.7 males.

The median income for a household in the town was $103,337, and the median income for a family was $107,033. Males had a median income of $44,063 versus $55,000 for females. The per capita income for the town was $77,390. There were no families and 10.4% of the population living below the poverty line, including no under eighteens and none of those over 64.

References 

Towns in Marion County, Indiana
Towns in Indiana
Indianapolis metropolitan area